Duncraig railway station is a remote railway station by the shore of Loch Carron on the Kyle of Lochalsh Line, originally (privately) serving Duncraig Castle, a mansion near Plockton, in the Highland council area of northern Scotland. ScotRail, who manage the station, operate all services at the station.

History
The station was built as a private station for Duncraig Castle by the Kyle of Lochalsh Extension (Highland Railway), opening on 2 November 1897.

It became a public station in 1949. Duncraig was closed between 7 December 1964 and 5 January 1976; it was reopened after local train drivers refused to acknowledge the station's closure for the intervening 11 years. One of the drivers is quoted as saying:"We thought that if the English wanted to close a railway station they should pick on Euston or King's Cross"The station is a Category B listed building.

Facilities 

The only facilities at the station are a small waiting room, a bench and a help point. The station, however, has step-free access. As there are no facilities to purchase tickets, passengers must buy one in advance, or from the guard on the train.

Passenger volume 

The statistics cover twelve month periods that start in April.

Services 

Four trains each way call (on request) on weekdays and Saturdays. On Sundays, there is only one train each way, plus a second from May to late September only.

References

Bibliography

External links 

Video footage of the station on YouTube

Railway stations in Highland (council area)
Railway stations served by ScotRail
Railway stations in Great Britain opened in 1949
Railway stations in Great Britain closed in 1964
Railway stations in Great Britain opened in 1976
Beeching closures in Scotland
Former Highland Railway stations
Railway request stops in Great Britain
Listed railway stations in Scotland
Category B listed buildings in Highland (council area)
Former private railway stations
Reopened railway stations in Great Britain